"'It's a Heartache'" is a song recorded by Welsh singer Bonnie Tyler. Written by Ronnie Scott and Steve Wolfe, and co-produced with David Mackay, the single was released in November 1977 through RCA Records. The song topped the charts in Australia, Canada, and numerous European countries, and reached No. 3 in the US and No. 4 in the UK. Worldwide, "It's a Heartache" sold around six million copies.

In the United States, Tyler's version was released in 1978 around the same time as tracks of it were released by Juice Newton and Ronnie Spector.

Background
"It's a Heartache" was recorded at The Factory Sound in Surrey, England in 1977. Producer David Mackay finished the construction of his recording studio in the summer of 1977, and this song was cut during the very first session.

"It's a Heartache" was one of the first recordings Tyler made following a surgical procedure to remove nodules from her vocal folds. The procedure left Tyler with an "unusually husky voice", which AllMusic journalist Marcy Donelson described as "an effective instrument".

Release
Producer David Mackay recalled that RCA was reluctant to release the single. The label was preoccupied with reissuing Elvis Presley's back catalogue following his recent death. Mackay, Scott and Wolfe threatened to terminate their contract with RCA if they did not release the track immediately. "It's a Heartache" was released on 4 November 1977 in parts of Europe, including the United Kingdom, and March 1978 in the United States and Canada.

Critical reception
The release had music critics comparing Tyler's voice to Rod Stewart's (he would eventually cover the song.) Carol Wetzel from Spokane Daily Chronicle complimented Tyler's voice on "It's a Heartache", stating that her previous big hit, "Lost in France", is "no big deal, probably because it was made before her voice changed."

Other versions
In 1978, Juice Newton put out a cover through Capitol Records, produced by John Palladino. Newton reached No. 86 on the US Billboard Hot 100 chart and No. 91 on the Canadian RPM 50 Singles Chart. In the same year, Ronnie Spector issued a single through Alston Records. Tyler, Newton and Spector's versions were all released in the same week in the United States, with Billboard listing each one as "recommended" tracks.

Lorrie Morgan - on her 1992 album Watch Me.

Dave & Sugar's 1981 rendition of "It's a Heartache" reached No. 32 on the Billboard Country Singles Chart. Trick Pony put their mark on it in 2005, peaking at No. 22 on the same chart.

In 2004, Tyler released a bilingual duet with French singer Kareen Antonn. Renamed "Si tout s'arrête", the single reached No. 7 on the Belgian Flanders chart, No. 12 in France and No. 25 in Switzerland. In the following year, Tyler included a solo version of the song, sung entirely in English, on her album Wings.

Ian Noe covers a portion of the song at the end of “Road May Flood” to close his 2022 album River Fools and Mountain Saints

Charts and certifications

Weekly charts

Year-end charts

Sales and certifications

References

External links
 

1977 songs
1977 singles
1978 singles
1982 singles
2005 singles
British country music songs
British folk rock songs
Bonnie Tyler songs
Dave & Sugar songs
Jill Johnson songs
Juice Newton songs
Lorrie Morgan songs
Trick Pony songs
RCA Records singles
Rod Stewart songs
Songs about heartache
Number-one singles in Australia
Number-one singles in New Zealand
Number-one singles in Norway
Number-one singles in Sweden
RPM Top Singles number-one singles
Songs written by Ronnie Scott (songwriter)
Songs written by Steve Wolfe
Thorleifs songs
Rock ballads